Boronia glabra, commonly known as sandstone boronia, is a plant in the citrus family Rutaceae and is endemic to eastern Australia. It is an erect or weak shrub with many branches, mostly glabrous leaves with a slightly paler underside, and bright pink, four-petalled flowers arranged singly in leaf axils.

Description
The eight stamens have glandular hairs near the tip.

Taxonomy and naming
Sandstone boronia was first formally described in 1899 by Joseph Maiden and Ernst Betche and given the name Boronia ledifolia var. glabra and the description was published in the journal Proceedings of the Linnean Society of New South Wales from a specimen collected near Peak Hill. In 1928, Edwin Cheel raised the variety to species status. The specific epithet (glabra) is a Latin word meaning "hairless", "bald" or "smooth".

Distribution and habitat
This boronia grows in open woodland between Eidsvold in Queensland and Cowra in New South Wales.

Conservation
Boronia glabra is classed as "least concern" under the Queensland Government Nature Conservation Act 1992.

References 

glabra
Flora of New South Wales
Flora of Queensland
Plants described in 1928
Taxa named by Joseph Maiden
Taxa named by Ernst Betche